Doi Pha Hom Pok National Park, formerly known as Mae Fang National Park and Doi Fa Hom Pok National Park, is the northernmost national park in Thailand. It straddles Fang, Mae Ai, and Chai Prakan Districts of Chiang Mai Province. The park covers 327,500 rai ~  of the mountain area of the Daen Lao Range, at the border with Myanmar. The park was established on September 4, 2000.

Doi Pha Hom Pok National Park is mostly covered with forest, where tree species such as Hopea odorata predominate with rare plant species such as Impatiens jurpioides and butterflies such as Teinopalpus imperialis and Meandrusa lachinus. Doi Lang, located within the park, is an excellent area for birdwatching. There are many hot mineral springs near the park headquarters in an area of 10 rai (16,000 m2). Water temperature ranges from 90-130 °C. The largest pond has hot steam rising 40–50 meters above the ground.

See also
List of national parks of Thailand
List of Protected Areas Regional Offices of Thailand

References

External links

Tourism Thailand

National parks of Thailand
Protected areas established in 2000
Geography of Chiang Mai province
Tourist attractions in Chiang Mai province
2000 establishments in Thailand
Daen Lao Range
Territorial disputes of Myanmar
Territorial disputes of Thailand